Davus pentaloris is a species of New World tarantula (family Theraphosidae) native to Mexico and Guatemala. Davus was at one time considered to be a synonym of Cyclosternum, and its species were placed in that genus, but this is no longer accepted.

D. pentaloris has been found to display high morphological variation across its widespread distribution. Due to the typically low dispersal capability of tarantulas and associated high levels of local endemism this led to a hypothesis of hidden diversity within the species, with the high morphological variation suspected to be evidence that D. pentaloris is actually a species complex. Morphological and molecular analyses employing mtDNA data led to the recognition of 13 clearly diagnosable species, with 12 of them being new to science.

References

External links 

Theraphosidae
Spiders of Mexico
Spiders of Central America
Spiders described in 1888